South Africa competed at the 2012 Winter Youth Olympics in Innsbruck, Austria. The South African team was made up of one athlete and two officials. Chantelle Jardim was the Chef De Mission of the team.

The athlete selected became the first black athlete to represent the country at any Winter Olympics.

Alpine skiing

South Africa has qualified one boy in alpine skiing.

Boy

See also
South Africa at the 2012 Summer Olympics

References

Nations at the 2012 Winter Youth Olympics
2012 in South African sport
South Africa at the Youth Olympics